In the 2004 season, Shelbourne were crowned League of Ireland Premier Division champions.

Personnel

Managerial and backroom staff 

Manager: Pat Fenlon
Assistant managers: Johnny McDonnell (to May 2004), Eamon Collins (from May 2004)

2004 squad members 

 (Captain)

Results of league tables

League of Ireland Premier Division

Final league table

League results summary

League form and results by round

UEFA Champions League 
First qualifying round

Aggregate 2 - 2, Shelbourne won on away goals rule

Second qualifying round

Shelbourne won 4 - 3 on aggregate

Third qualifying round

Deportivo La Coruña won 3 - 0 on aggregate

UEFA Cup 
First round

Lille won 4 - 2 on aggregate

FAI Cup 
Second round

Third round

Replay

League of Ireland Cup 
First round Group 7

Group 7 table

2004 season statistics

Top Goalscorers

References 

2004
Shelbourne
Shels